Employment equity, as defined in federal Canadian law by the Employment Equity Act, requires federal jurisdiction employers to engage in proactive employment practices to increase the representation of four designated groups: women, people with disabilities, Indigenous peoples, and visible minorities. The act states that "employment equity means more than treating persons the same way but also requires special measures and the accommodation of differences".

The act requires that employers remove barriers to employment that disadvantage members of the four designated groups. The term reasonable accommodation is often used for the removal of such barriers to employment. Examples of employment barriers are wheelchair inaccessible buildings, or recruitment through word-of-mouth only. Employers are also required to institute positive policies for the hiring, training, retention, and promotion of members of the designated groups. Examples of positive policies include recruitment in Aboriginal communities, job advertisements in minority-language newspapers, or an apprentice program directed toward people with disabilities.

History 

The roots of employment equity are in the 1984 Abella commission, chaired by Judge Rosalie Abella. She considered a U.S. term, "affirmative action", but decided not to use it because of the emotions and ill will surrounding affirmative action. In its place she created the term "employment equity" for the Canadian context. Abella's report later became the foundation of the Employment Equity Act of 1986, later amended as the Employment Equity Act of 1995. In Ontario the act as a legislation was once repealed by Mike Harris stating falsely that it was for implementing a quota system. The purpose of the act, as stated in the legislation itself, is:

Designated groups 

The Employment Equity Act designates four groups as the beneficiaries of employment equity:
 
 Women
 People with disabilities
 Aboriginal people, a category consisting of Status Indians, Non-status Indians, Métis (people of mixed French-Aboriginal ancestry in western Canada), and Inuit (the Aboriginal people of the Arctic). 
 Visible minorities

Coverage 

The Employment Equity Act is federal legislation, and as such, applies only to a narrow group of industries that are federally regulated under the Canadian constitution: banks, broadcasters, telecommunication companies, railroads, airlines, private businesses necessary to the operation of a federal act, maritime transportation companies, other transportation companies if inter-provincial in nature, uranium-related organizations, federal crown corporations, and corporations controlled by two or more provincial governments. Overall, federal employment equity legislation covers 10% of the Canadian workforce. Thus the scope of the Employment Equity Act is quite limited, and the vast majority of employers, including nearly all retailers and manufacturing companies, fall outside its jurisdiction.

The Canadian federal government also administers the Federal Contractors' Program (FCP). This is not under the Employment Equity Act, but rather is a non-legislated program that extends employment equity to organizations beyond the scope of the act that provide eligible goods and services to the federal government. The FCP states that suppliers of goods and services to the federal government (with some specified exceptions) must have an employment equity program in place.

Some provinces use the term "employment equity" in conjunction with their enforcement of provincial-level human rights legislation (for example, British Columbia). The government of Quebec requires that employers show preference to people with disabilities, which could be considered a form of employment equity. However, while every province has human rights legislation to prohibit discrimination against women and various minorities, no province has a law that is an analogue to the federal Employment Equity Act.

Regulatory oversight 

Oversight of employment equity is shared among three federal government agencies. For private sector employers that are federally regulated, Employment and Social Development Canada collects data from employers and conducts research related to the Employment Equity Act. The Treasury Board Secretariat oversees the administration of employment equity in the federal government itself. The Canadian Human Rights Commission deals with both private and public sector employers that are federally regulated, and is responsible for conducting audits of employers' compliance.

In addition to the above, Employment and Social Development Canada is responsible for oversight of the Federal Contractors' Program.

Controversy 

Employment equity is surrounded with controversy, as has occurred with similar programs in the U.S. and other countries. Opponents of employment equity argue that it violates common-sense notions of fairness and equality. Economists Cristina Echavarria and Mobinul Huq propose that employment equity be redesigned so that employers are required to remove barriers to men applying for female-dominated jobs, as well as barriers to women applying for male-dominated jobs.

On the other hand, proponents maintain that employment equity is necessary to amend historic wrongs and to ameliorate the economic differences among groups. A particular point of contention has been the category visible minorities, which lumps together numerous ethnic groups, some of whom are affluent and some of whom are severely disadvantaged.

Some argue that the act should have been stricter. Others have argued that employment equity should rely more on moral suasion rather than legal remedies. Among those who argue for strictness, the act has been criticized as an example of "soft-law", meaning token penalties combined with an overly casual use of compliance statistics. Other researchers have argued for a more conciliatory approach based on self-regulation, employee participation, and appeals to employers’ sense of self-interest. Some have also contended that employment equity is in conflict with the Canadian Human Rights Act which prohibits discrimination on the basis of gender, race, ethnicity, and certain other grounds, since biasing hiring practices to prefer designated groups is necessarily discriminatory against non-designated groups. However, the equality section of the Canadian Charter of Rights and Freedoms explicitly permits affirmative action type legislation, although the Charter does not require legislation that gives preferential treatment. Subsection 2 of Section 15 states that the equality provisions do "not preclude any law, program or activity that has as its object the amelioration of conditions of disadvantaged individuals or groups including those that are disadvantaged because of race, national or ethnic origin, colour, religion, sex, age or mental or physical disability."

In July 2010, controversy arose when a Caucasian woman, Sara Landriault, was barred from applying for employment in a federal agency because she was not in a racial minority. This incident led Stockwell Day, then president of the Treasury Board of Canada, to announce a review of employment equity.

Distinct from other human rights concepts 

The Canadian Human Rights Act has long prohibited discrimination on the basis of gender, race, ethnicity, and certain other grounds. The Canadian Human Rights Act continues to be in force alongside the Employment Equity Act. The key distinction between the two laws is that the Canadian Human Rights Act merely prohibits discrimination, whereas the Employment Equity Act requires employers to engage in proactive measures to improve the employment opportunities of the four specific groups listed above. Note that the Canadian Human Rights Act protects a wider range of minorities (such as sexual minorities and religious minorities), while the Employment Equity Act limits its coverage to the aforementioned four protected groups. In Canada, employment equity is a specific legal concept, and should not be used as a synonym for non-discrimination or workplace diversity.

Employment equity should not be confused with pay equity, which is an entirely distinct concept. Pay equity, as a Canadian legal term, refers to the legal requirement that predominantly female occupations be paid the same as predominantly male occupations of equal importance within a given organization.

One way of understanding the distinction between employment equity and pay equity (comparable worth) is to note that they take different approaches to dealing with the problem of predominantly female occupations being underpaid. Employment equity aims to increase the number of women in well-paid occupations. In contrast, pay equity implicitly recognizes how difficult it is to integrate predominantly male occupations, and instead aims to increase the pay of predominantly female occupations. Employment equity also addresses the situation of Aboriginal people, visible minorities, and people with disabilities, whereas pay equity addresses solely the dilemma that predominantly female occupations tend to be underpaid.

References

External links 
Employment equity in federally regulated workplaces (Employment and Social Development Canada)
Federal Contractors' Program
Status of Women Canada (an agency of the Canadian government)
Treasury Board of Canada Secretariat

Canadian federal legislation
Canadian labour law
Human rights in Canada
Affirmative action in North America
Employment equity
Employment in Canada